is a Japanese competitive swimmer who specializes in individual medley.

He qualified for the 2016 Summer Olympics in Rio de Janeiro in the 200 meter individual medley after clearing the qualification time by 0.05 seconds. He finished 4th in the final, 0.16 seconds behind the bronze medalist.

Fujimori had his results at the 2018 World Short Course Championships from 14 December 2018 disqualified and served a 24 month suspension by FINA from January 2019 through December 2020 for an anti-doping rule violation on 14 December 2018 at the Championships.

References

1991 births
Living people
Japanese male medley swimmers
Swimmers at the 2016 Summer Olympics
Olympic swimmers of Japan
Asian Games silver medalists for Japan
Medalists at the 2014 Asian Games
Asian Games medalists in swimming
Swimmers at the 2014 Asian Games
Universiade medalists in swimming
Universiade silver medalists for Japan
Medalists at the 2013 Summer Universiade
21st-century Japanese people